Gutter is a biannual periodical published in Scotland. The magazine was founded in 2009 and is independently published in Glasgow. The magazine is cooperatively owned and run by its workers.

Overview
Publishing prose, poetry and reviews, the magazine is 192 pages long and is a biannual publication. Notable Gutter contributors have included Alasdair Gray, Janice Galloway, Liz Lochhead, Louise Welsh, Ron Butlin, James Kelman and Alexander Hutcheson as well as new writers.

Editors
Managing editor Henry Bell and lead editors Colin Begg and Kate MacLeary are joined by five other editors – Laura Waddell, Calum Rodger, Robbie Guillory, Katy Hastie, and Ryan Vance.

References

External links
 Gutter

Biannual magazines published in the United Kingdom
Magazines established in 2009
Literary magazines published in Scotland